Batangas College of Arts and Sciences, Inc., formerly known as the Batangas Science School, is a private school founded November 23, 2000  in Banay-banay Concepcion, Lipa City.  The school's first class had 19 students. The number of students gradually increased, noticeably during the school year 2002–2003, wherein 521 were studying at the school.

The school's motto was "Competence, Character, Compassion" and was then changed to "To Climb the Mountain, To Kiss the Clouds".  The new emblem, which portrayed Mount Maculot with a coconut tree in the foreground, was designed by Mark Anthony de Castro, brother of Maria Lourdes de Castro, valedictorian of the pioneer class.

In its first year, the school published its first English school paper, Vanguard (editor-in-chief was Maria Lourdes de Castro), simultaneously with its Filipino counterpart, Kalasag (editor-in-chief was Altaire Thyra Bautista).  The following year, the school organ changed its name to The BSSAN (pronounced as Bessan; editor-in-chief was Daniel C. Lachica Jr.).

Now, the Batangas College of Arts and Sciences, Inc. has two campuses, one for high school and college students, and the other for preparatory and elementary students.

Science high schools in the Philippines
Schools in Lipa, Batangas
High schools in Batangas